The Politics of Yiyang in Hunan province in the People's Republic of China is structured in a dual party-government system like all other governing institutions in mainland China.

The Mayor of Yiyang is the highest-ranking official in the People's Government of Yiyang or Yiyang Municipal Government. However, in the city's dual party-government governing system, the Mayor has less power than the Communist Party of Yiyang Municipal Committee Secretary, colloquially termed the "CPC Party Chief of Yiyang" or "Communist Party Secretary of Yiyang".

History
On May 26, 2014, Yang Baohua was put under investigation for alleged "serious violations of discipline and laws." by the Central Commission for Discipline Inspection (CCDI), the Communist Party's anti-graft watchdog. He underwent investigation for corruption in 2014.

List of mayors of Yiyang

List of CPC Party secretaries of Yiyang

References

Yiyang
Yiyang